Sir Hugh Evelyn Lockhart-Mummery, KVCO, (28 April 1918 - 24 June 1988), was a British surgeon who researched inflammatory bowel disease and distinguished Crohn's from colitis. He was educated at Sandroyd School and Stowe School. He was Serjeant-Surgeon to The Queen.

See also
List of honorary medical staff at King Edward VII's Hospital for Officers

References 

1918 births
1988 deaths
People educated at Sandroyd School
20th-century British medical doctors
People educated at Stowe School